Joshua Lodge (born 14 September 1981), is an Australian athlete who competes in the high jump. Joshua won the 2003 Australian Championships.

References

1981 births
Living people
Australian male high jumpers